for the World War II 52d Bombardment Squadron, see: 52d Expeditionary Flying Training Squadron
The 52d Bombardment Squadron is an inactive United States Air Force unit. Its last assignment was to the 68th Bombardment Wing, stationed at Chennault Air Force Base, Louisiana.

It was inactivated on 15 April 1963.

History
Established in 1947 as a weather recon squadron; it was equipped with second-line observation aircraft and flew weather flights along the California coastline. It was inactivated in 1949 due to budget restrictions, but reactivated under Strategic Air Command (SAC) as an RB-29 Superfortress very long range reconnaissance squadron which flew missions primarily over the Arctic mapping flight routes if needed for B-36 Peacemaker bombers to fly over the North Pole to attack targets in the Soviet Union.

Re-designated in June 1952 as a B-47 Stratojet medium bomber squadron, its aircraft were not received until April 1953 when the squadron received the first production block of B-47Es. It conducted routine deployments and training during the 1950s and early 1960s. It was inactivated in 1963 with the phaseout of the B-47.

Lineage
 Established as the 52d Reconnaissance Squadron, Weather Scouting and activated on 12 Jul 1947
 Inactivated on 27 June 1949
 Redesignated as the 52d Strategic Reconnaissance Squadron, Photographic and activated on 10 Oct 1951
 Redesignated as the 52d Bombardment Squadron, Medium on 16 Jun 1952
 Inactivated on 15 April 1963

Assignments
 68th Reconnaissance Group, 12 Jul 1947 – 27 Jun 1949
 68th Strategic Reconnaissance Group, 10 Oct 1951
 68th Bombardment Wing, 16 Jun 1952 – 15 Apr 1963

Stations
 Hamilton Field (later, AFB), California, 9 April 1947 – 27 June 1949
 Lake Charles (later, Chennault) AFB, Louisiana, 10 October 1951 – 15 April 1963

Aircraft
 Consolidated A-11, 1947-1949
 RB-29 Superfortress, 1951-1953
 B-47 Stratojet, 1953–1963

References

052
Military units and formations established in 1947